The Encyclopedia of Serbian Historiography is a one-volume encyclopedia on Serbian historiography, art history, literary history, ethnology and archaeology, edited by Sima Ćirković and Rade Mihaljčić.

Structure 

The encyclopedia features articles by more than 350 authors, divided into three parts:

Serbian Historiography
Serbian Historiography
1997 non-fiction books
Historiography of Serbia
20th-century encyclopedias